Kačice is a municipality and village in Kladno District in the Central Bohemian Region of the Czech Republic. It has about 1,200 inhabitants.

History
The first written mention of Kačice is from 1318.

References

Villages in Kladno District